The 2013 Philippine House of Representatives elections were the 33rd lower house elections in the Philippines. They were held on May 13, 2013 to elect members to the House of Representatives of the Philippines that would serve in the 16th Congress of the Philippines from June 30, 2013 to June 30, 2016.

The Philippines uses parallel voting for the House of Representatives: first past the post on 234 single member districts, and via closed party lists on a 2% election threshold computed via a modified Hare quota (3-seat cap and no remainders) on 58 seats, with parties with less than 1% of the first preference vote winning one seat each if 20% of the party-list seats are not filled up. Major parties are not allowed to participate in the party-list election.

While the concurrent Senate election features the two major coalitions in Team PNoy and the United Nationalist Alliance (UNA), the constituent parties of the coalitions contested the lower house election separately, and in some districts, candidates from the same coalition in the Senate are contesting a single seat. Campaigns for the House of Representatives are done on a district-by-district basis; there is no national campaign conducted by the parties. No matter the election result, the party of the president usually controls the House of Representatives, via a grand coalition of almost all parties. Only the ruling Liberal Party can win a majority, as it is the only party to put up candidates in a majority of seats.

After release of preliminary results, the Liberal Party emerged as the largest party in the chamber. Its coalition partners also held most of their seats. Incumbent Speaker Feliciano Belmonte, Jr. was easily reelected as the Speaker of the 16th Congress.

Electoral system
The election for seats in the House of Representatives is done via parallel voting. A voter has two votes: one for one's local district, and another via the party-list system. A candidate is not allowed to stand for both ballots, and parties participating in the district elections would have to ask for permission on the Commission on Elections, with major parties not allowed to participate in the party-list election.

Election via the districts
Each district sends one representative to the House of Representatives, with the winner with the highest number of votes winning that district's seat. The representatives from the districts comprise at most 80% of the seats.

Election via the party-list system
In the party-list system, the parties contesting the election represent a sector, or several sectors, or an ethnic group. In determining the winners, the entire country is treated as one "district". Each party that surpasses the 2% election threshold automatically wins one seat, they can win an additional number of seats in proportion to the number of votes they received, but they can't have more than three seats. The representatives elected via the party-list system, also known as "sectoral representatives" should comprise at least 20% of the seats. However, since the winners from the parties that surpass the 2% threshold had not reached the 20% quota ever since the party-list system was instituted, the parties that received less than 1% of the first preference vote are given one seat each until the 20% quota has been filled up.

Campaigning
The parties contesting the district elections campaign at the district level; there is no national-level campaigning. While no party has been able to win a majority of seats in the House of Representatives since the 1987 elections, the party of the incumbent president had usually controlled the chamber in the phenomenon known locally as the "Padrino System" or patronage politics, with other parties aligning themselves with the president's policies in exchange for pork barrel and future political favors.

While the parties contesting the Senate election grouped themselves into two major electoral alliances (Team PNoy and the United Nationalist Alliance), the constituent parties of those alliances separately contested the elections to the House of Representatives. However, as stated above, the parties will again coalesce once the 16th Congress of the Philippines convenes.

Redistricting
Reapportioning (redistricting) the number of seats is either via national reapportionment after the release of every census, or via piecemeal redistricting for every province or city. National reapportionment has not happened since the 1987 constitution took effect, and aside from piecemeal redistricting, the apportionment was based on the ordinance from the constitution, which was in turn based from the 1980 census.

These are the following laws pertaining to redistricting that were passed by Congress. While a locality that has a minimum of 250,000 people is constitutionally entitled to one district representative, Congress should enact a law in order for it to take effect. The creation of new districts may be politically motivated, in order to prevent political allies (or even opponents) from contesting one seat.

Bukidnon, Cotabato, Palawan and Quezon City received additional representatives in the upcoming Congress. 

The number of new legislative districts may also increase the seats allocated for party-list representatives: for every five new legislative districts, one seat for a party-list representative is also created.

Marginal seats
These are seats where the winning margin was 3% or less, politicians may choose to run under a different political party as compared to 2010. This excludes districts where the nearest losing candidate or that candidate's party is not contesting the election, or districts that were redistricted.

Retiring and term-limited incumbents

These are the incumbents who are not running for a seat in the House of Representatives, and are not term limited:

Lakas-CMD
Lapu-Lapu City: Arturo Radaza
Lanao del Norte–2nd: Fatima Aliah Dimaporo
Masbate–1st: Antonio Kho
Ran and lost in the Masbate gubernatorial election.
Pampanga–1st: Carmelo Lazatin
Ran and lost in the Angeles mayoral election.
Zamboanga del Norte-3rd: Cesar Jalosjos
Ran and lost in the Zamboanga del Norte gubernatorial election.
Liberal Party
Aklan-Lone: Florencio Miraflores
Ran and Won in the Aklan gubernatorial election.
Cavite–3rd: Erineo Maliksi
Ran and lost in the Cavite gubernatorial election.
Cebu City–1st: Rachel del Mar
Cebu City–2nd: Tomas Osmeña
Ran and lost in the Cebu City mayoral election.
Negros Oriental–1st: Jocelyn Limkaichong
Ran and lost in the Negros Oriental gubernatorial election.
Pangasinan–3rd: Rachel Arenas
Parañaque–1st: Edwin Olivarez
Ran and won in the Parañaque mayoral election.
Quezon–2nd: Irvin Alcala
Ran and lost in the Quezon gubernatorial election.
Taguig–2nd: Sigfrido Tinga
Zamboanga City–1st: Maria Isabelle Climaco Salazar
Ran and won in the Zamboanga City mayoral election.
Nacionalista Party
Davao del Sur–1st: Marc Douglas Cagas IV
Ran and lost in the Davao del Sur gubernatorial election.
Ilocos Sur–1st: Ryan Singson
Ran and won in the Ilocos Sur gubernatorial election.
Misamis Oriental–2nd: Yevgeny Vincente Emano
Ran and won in the Misamis Oriental gubernatorial election.
Zamboanga Sibugay–1st: Jonathan Yambao

National Unity Party
Camarines Norte–1st: Renato Unico, Jr.
Ran and lost in the Camarines Norte gubernatorial election.
Cavite–6th: Antonio Ferrer
Ran and won in the General Trias mayoral election.
Cebu–3rd: Pablo John Garcia
Ran and lost in the Cebu gubernatorial election.
Nationalist People's Coalition
Cagayan–1st: Juan Ponce Enrile, Jr.
Ran and lost in the Senate election.
Cebu–6th: Ramon Durano VI
Ran and won in the Danao vice mayoral election.
Isabela–1st: Rodolfo Albano, Jr.
Nueva Ecija–1st: Josefina Joson
Ran and lost in the Nueva Ecija gubernatorial election.
South Cotabato–2nd: Daisy Avance-Fuentes
Valenzuela–1st: Rexlon Gatchalian
Ran and won in the Valenzuela mayoral election.
United Nationalist Alliance
San Juan: JV Ejercito
Ran and won in the Senate election.

Defeated incumbents

Open seat gains

Liberal Party
Albay–1st
Agusan del Norte–1st
Caloocan–1st
Camarines Sur–3rd
Cavite–1st (vacant seat originally held by the Liberals)
Cavite–7th
Dinagat Islands (vacant seat originally held by Lakas)*
Maguindanao–2nd
Occidental Mindoro
Quezon City–5th (new seat notionally held by the Liberals)
Quezon City–6th (new seat notionally held by the Liberals)
Siquijor
Tawi–Tawi
Zamboanga del Norte–3rd
Zamboanga Sibugay–1st
Laban ng Demokratikong Pilipino
Zamboanga City–1st
Nacionalista Party
Batangas–2nd
Taguig–2nd

Nationalist People's Coalition
Bohol–2nd (vacant seat originally held by the NPC)
Bukidnon–4th (new seat notionally held by the NPC)
Camiguin (vacant seat originally held by the NPC)
Palawan–3rd (new seat notionally held by the NUP)
Sorsogon–1st (vacant seat originally held by the Liberals)
Zambales–1st
United Nationalist Alliance
Cebu–3rd
Parañaque–2nd
Local parties
Nueva Ecija–1st (Unang Sigaw)
Palawan–2nd (PPP)
PPP's candidate is a member of the NUP, the party it gained the seat from.
Pampanga–1st (Kambilan)
Kambilan's candidate is connected to Lakas-CMD, the party it gained the seat from.
San Juan (Magdiwang)
Magdiwang is the local affiliate of UNA, the party it gained the seat from.
Independents
Aklan
Cotabato–3rd (new seat notionally held by the Liberals)
Misamis Oriental–2nd
Zamboanga City–2nd

*Kaka Bag-ao is a party–list representative for Akbayan who ran in Dinagat Islands district under the Liberal Party and won.

Results

District elections
Only the Liberal Party can win the election outright by placing candidates in a majority of seats. With 292 seats, including seats reserved for sectoral representatives, 147 seats are needed for a majority, and only the Liberal Party is contesting more than 150 seats.

The Liberal Party did win a near majority of the district seats. They are expected to form a coalition with other Team PNoy component parties, other parties, most independents, and most party-list representatives for a large working majority. Lakas-CMD is expected to form the minority bloc anew, while the United Nationalist Alliance and left-leaning representatives may join either bloc.

A total of six independents won, one less than in 2010.

The vote totals below were collected from the results displayed from the COMELEC's "Transparency" server. These are partial and unofficial. The seats won are the ones which had been officially proclaimed by the COMELEC.

Party-list election

The Commission on Elections was supposed to release results for the party-list election along with the results for the Senate election; however, the commission suspended the release of results after questions of whether to include votes for the twelve disqualified parties, although not with finality, were to be included or not. Canvassing of results for the party-list election resumed on May 19 after the 12 senators-elect were already proclaimed, with the commission meeting to determine on what to do with the votes of the twelve disqualified parties. On May 22, the commission announced that they will proclaim the winning parties, but not the number of seats.

Details

Seat totals

Aftermath

Preliminary results states that President Aquino's allies winning an overwhelming majority of seats in the House of Representatives. This makes Aquino the only president enjoy majorities in both houses of Congress since the People Power Revolution of 1986. This is seen as an endorsement of the voters of Aquino's reformist agenda; although several key wins elsewhere by the United Nationalist Alliance and its allies would mean that Aquino's chosen successor may face a significant challenge in the 2016 presidential election.

Speaker Feliciano Belmonte, Jr. is seen to keep his speakership position with the Liberals winning at least 100 out of the 234 district seats. Majority Leader Neptali Gonzales II said that a great majority of incumbents are poised to successfully defend their seats, and that the Liberal Party are to be the single largest party in the lower house. The Nacionalista Party has at least 15 winning representatives, "a substantial number" of the 40 incumbents Nationalist People's Coalition are to hold their seats, and the 34-member National Unity Party House leader Rodolfo Antonino expects Belmonte to be reelected as speaker. The United Nationalist Alliance won three seats in Metro Manila, and at least 2 more seats outside the metropolis.

Election for the Speakership
15th Congress Speaker Feliciano Belmonte, Jr. easily won reelection for the speakership. The race for minority leader, usually given to the person finishing second in the speakership race, was narrowly won by Ronaldo Zamora over Ferdinand Martin Romualdez. There was one abstention, from Toby Tiangco, who wanted to be an independent. Belmonte also abstained from voting, while Romaualdez and Zamora voted for themselves; if Belmonte only had one opponent he would've voted for his opponent, and his opponent would've voted for him (as seen in the 15th Congress speakership election). Since there were more than two nominees, the traditional courtesy votes did not push through.

References

House of Representatives
2013